Diedorf is a municipality in the district of Augsburg, in Bavaria, Germany. It is situated on the river Schmutter, 9 km west of Augsburg city centre.

Geography
The municipality of Diedorf consists of the market town of Diedorf and eight villages and hamlets: Anhausen, Biburg, Hausen, Kreppen, Lettenbach, Oggenhof, Vogelsang, and Willishausen.

Economy
The paint manufacturer Keimfarben is headquartered here.

References

Augsburg (district)